Rubber is an album by the Canadian hard rock band Rubber (formerly known as Harem Scarem). The band released the album in 1999 under the name Harem Scarem in Japan, and in 2000 in Canada they released it as Rubber. After this release, drummer Darren Smith left and was replaced with Creighton Doane. The song "Sunshine" was produced and mixed by Canadian producer Arnold Lanni.

Track listing

Release history

Band members
Harry Hess – lead vocals, guitar, producer
Pete Lesperance – lead guitar, backing vocals, producer
Barry Donaghy – bass, backing vocals
Darren Smith – drums, backing vocals

References 

1999 albums
2000 albums
Harem Scarem albums
Warner Music Group albums